Murik can be:
Nor language (New Guinea)
Murik Kayan language (Borneo)